William Finnie (6 November 1827 in Kilmarnock – 3 December 1899 in St Leonards-on-Sea) was a Scottish lawyer and Liberal Party politician.

Life
The third son of James Finnie, a merchant in London, Lisbon and Rio de Janeiro, and Mary Ann Brown, he was educated at Merchiston Castle Academy, King's College London, and Trinity College, Cambridge.

He was called to the bar at the Inner Temple in 1853 but never practiced.

He was a justice of the peace for Ayrshire.

He was elected as Liberal Member of Parliament for North Ayrshire at the 1868 general election but was defeated at the 1874 election.
He married Antoinette BURNARD d/o George BURNARD in 1853

References

External links 
 

1828 births
1899 deaths
Members of the Parliament of the United Kingdom for Scottish constituencies
Scottish Liberal Party MPs
UK MPs 1868–1874
Alumni of King's College London
Alumni of Trinity College, Cambridge
People educated at Merchiston Castle School